The Best of Keith Sweat: Make You Sweat is a greatest hits album by Keith Sweat. The record was certified Gold by the RIAA in 2005. A DVD collection featuring the videos for the songs on the album was also released in the same year

Track listing

Charts

Weekly charts

Year-end charts

References

Keith Sweat compilation albums
2004 greatest hits albums
Elektra Records compilation albums